José Guadalupe Martínez Álvarez (born January 27, 1983) is a former Mexican goalkeeper for the team Estudiantes Tecos, the Mexican professional football club associated with the Universidad Autónoma de Guadalajara AC.  Álvarez made his debut with the club Tecos UAG in 2002.

External links
 
Profile at BDFA

1983 births
Living people
Mexican footballers
Mexico under-20 international footballers
Liga MX players
Tecos F.C. footballers
Club Tijuana footballers
Club Puebla players
Querétaro F.C. footballers
Irapuato F.C. footballers
Association football goalkeepers